State Route 138 (SR 138) is an east–west state highway in the southwestern portion of the U.S. state of Ohio.  Its west terminus is at its intersection with SR 134 in Buford and its eastern terminus is at its intersection with US 22 east of Williamsport.

History
SR 138 was first designated on its current route between Hillsboro and Greenfield in 1923, though the road had been a part of the state highway system since its creation in 1912 as SR 260. The route was extended in 1937 from its two ends to the route it travels today. No major changes to SR 138's routing have occurred since then.

Major junctions

References

138
Transportation in Highland County, Ohio
Transportation in Ross County, Ohio
Transportation in Pickaway County, Ohio